Harold Baker may refer to:

Harold Baker (cricketer) (1884–1954), English cricketer
Harold Baker (judge) (born 1929), federal judge on United States District Courts in Illinois
Harold Baker (photographer) (1860–1942), British photographer
Harold Napier Baker (c. 1877–1950), Anglican priest in Australia
Harold Baker (politician) (1877–1960), British politician, Financial Secretary to the War Office 1912–1915
H. A. Baker (1881–1971), American author and Pentecostal missionary
George Harold Baker (1877–1916), lawyer, political figure, and soldier from Quebec, Canada
Harold Brooks-Baker (1933–2005), American-British financier, journalist, and publisher, and self-proclaimed expert on genealogy
Shorty Baker (1914–1966), American jazz musician

See also
Harry Baker (disambiguation)
Harald Baker (1882–1962), Australian rugby union player